Stuart Hogg (born 24 June 1992) is a Scottish rugby union player who plays for Exeter Chiefs in the English Premiership and used to captain the Scottish national team. His playing positions are fullback and fly-half.

Hogg has twice been named Six Nations Player of the Tournament, in 2016 and 2017. He has been selected to tour with the British & Irish Lions on three consecutive occasions (2013, 2017 and 2021). His 2017 tour was cut short due to an injury, but in 2021 he gained two Lions Test caps against South Africa.

Early life and education 
Hogg comes from the Scottish Borders. His father, John, played rugby at full-back for Hawick and refereed. His brother, Graham Hogg played for Scotland in the IRB Sevens World Series and at under-18, under-19 and under-20. Hogg is a distant relative of George Best.

Hogg was a pupil at Trinity Primary School and Hawick High School.

Rugby Union career

Amateur career

Hogg played at Hawick Wanderers, Hawick and Heriot's.

Hogg was drafted to Stirling County in the Scottish Premiership for the 2008–09 season.

Hogg was linked to Glasgow Warriors for 18 months as part of the Elite Development Programme run by Scottish Rugby and signed his first professional contract at the end of 2011.

Professional career
Hogg first came to prominence when he was named Player of the Year with Scotland under-17s. He later captained Scotland under-18 against Wales having been named man-of-the-match against France in 2010.

Hogg made his debut for Glasgow Warriors in the Magners League in February 2011 and that same month was part of the Scotland under-20 team. He went on to earn five caps competing in the under-20 6 Nations and the IRB Junior World Championship in the summer of 2011.

Hogg made two Warriors appearances in season 2010–11 and began the 2011–12 RaboDirect PRO12 campaign as the club's starting full-back. He was named in the Pro12 Dream team at the end of the 2012/13 season.  It was announced in November 2014 that Stuart Hogg had signed a two-year contract extension with the Glasgow Warriors, keeping him at the club until at least May 2017. He signed a further contract in 2016 taking him to the end of the 2018/19 season with me.  In 2017 Hogg became the youngest player to reach 100 appearances at the age of just 24.

In November 2018 it was announced Hogg would be leaving Glasgow Warriors after nine years, and joining Exeter Chiefs after the 2019 RWC. 

Hogg become a European and English premiership champion with Exeter Chiefs in 2020, playing an important role in their triumphs over Racing 92 in the European Champions Cup Final and Wasps in the Gallagher Premiership Final.

Scotland national team

Hogg has represented Scotland at under-17, under-18, and under-20 level before he went on to gain full international honours.

2012–2014 
Hogg gained his first cap for the Scotland national rugby union team after earning a call up to Andy Robinson's 36-man squad for the 2012 Six Nations following a series of impressive performances for Glasgow. Hogg impressed on his debut against Wales in Cardiff, coming on as a substitute following injury to Max Evans. Hogg was subsequently named in the starting line-up for the first time for the match versus France. He scored his first try for Scotland in the 8th minute against France.

In the 2013 Six Nations Hogg scored his second and third international tries against England in round one and in round two he scored against the Italians an intercept try from his 5-metre line and ran 95 metres to score his third international try.

On 8 March 2014, Hogg scored his 4th international try against France at Murrayfield. On 15 March, he was sent off in a Six Nations game against Wales for a late and dangerous hit on Dan Biggar, although originally shown a yellow card by referee Jérôme Garcès the referee then looked at the replays on one of the big screens in the stadium and upgraded his decision to a red card.
On 8 June 2014, during Scotland's Summer tour he made his first appearance against the US after his red card against Wales and he marked that game with his 5th International try. On 14 June 2014, he slotted a crucial 43-metre kick to secure a win against Canada at BMO Stadium the final score was 17–19 to Scotland during the Scotland Summer tour. On 20 June 2014, he scored his sixth try for Scotland against Argentina during the Scotland summer tour. Scotland won the game 21–18.

Hogg played a role in Scotland 7s team in the Commonwealth Games in Glasgow at Ibrox Stadium. He scored one try in the competition. During Scotland's Autumn internationals in 2014 he scored two tries, one against Argentina at Murrayfield and one against Tonga at Rugby Park, Kilmarnock.

2015–2019
In a struggling Scotland side in the 2015 Six Nations Championship, Hogg made the most metres (442); beat the most defenders (18); and made the second most carries (63). Defensively, he also made a significant contribution as a cover tackler, particularly against England where he made four last-ditch tackles in the opening quarter of the game.

Domestically it was a successful season for Hogg, with Glasgow Warriors winning their first ever Pro 12 title at Ravenhill in Belfast.

Hogg played in all five of Scotland's matches at the 2015 Rugby World Cup, in which Scotland were eliminated at the quarterfinal stage by Australia.

The 2016 Six Nations Championship again saw Hogg in the thick of the action, scoring tries against France and Ireland, the latter an inspired 55-metre individual effort after collecting a high ball. He was also widely praised for his creativity throughout the tournament, setting up tries against the French and Italy. Following a public vote, Hogg was named as the Six Nations Player of the Championship, the first Scottish player to receive the award.

Hogg had a great 2017 Six Nations Championship scoring two tries against Ireland, he then continued this good form by scoring against France. In the last game of the 2017 Six Nations Championship against Italy he added 3 points with the boot in the 29–0 victory. He received a second successive Player of the Championship award, becoming the second person to achieve this.
Stuart Hogg received man of the match against New Zealand 18/11/17. He is now recognised as one of the best full backs in international rugby. On 25 November 2017, Hogg was injured in the warm up before the game against Australia.

In the 2019 Six Nations Championship, Hogg started Scotland's opening game against Italy and their second round clash with Ireland, however he was taken out just after kicking the ball by Irish flanker Peter O'Mahony. This controversial no arms tackle resulted in a shoulder injury for Hogg and Referee Jerome Garces was widely criticised for not stopping play nor checking the TMO. Hogg subsequently sat out the rest of the championship, adding to Scotland's injury woes.

2020–present: Team captaincy

Hogg was named captain for the 2020 Six Nations Championship, starting against Ireland, England, Italy and France and being set to start against Wales before the worldwide pandemic of COVID-19 halted that match. He scored Scotland's first try of the tournament in the 17–0 victory over Italy, running in from his own half to score in the corner. He also crossed the line against Ireland, but dropped the ball as he went to ground it with his right hand. Upon the resumption of the tournament in the autumn, he led Scotland to their first away victory in Wales for 18 years, kicking a penalty during his side's 14-10 triumph.

Hogg was an ever-present in Scotland's 2021 Six Nations Championship, captaining the side to memorable away victories over England (for the first time since 1983) and France (for the first time since 1999). The campaign also saw Hogg score two tries against Wales and numerous points with the boot against Ireland and Italy.

Hogg's form during the championship saw him heavily-tipped to be selected for the British & Irish Lions for a third time, with the 2021 tour to South Africa imminent.

During Scotland's match against Japan at Murrayfield on 20 November 2021, Hogg scored his 25th international try, becoming Scotland's all-time record try scorer.

Hogg captained Scotland for their first back to back win against England in four decades, during the first game of the 2022 6 nations, kicking the ball into touch during the final play.

International

International Points

Scores and results indicate Scotland point tally in bold.

British & Irish Lions

Hogg was one of the four Scotland players called up for the Lions squad for the 2013 British & Irish Lions tour to Australia and was the youngest player on the 2013 tour.

Hogg was named as one of two Scottish players in the initial squad selected for the 2017 British & Irish Lions tour to New Zealand in June and July. Hogg was injured after being caught by the elbow of team-mate Conor Murray in an accidental collision during his third appearance of the tour in a provincial match, and left the tour before the start of the Test Matches.

In May 2021 Hogg was selected to tour for a third time on the 2021 British & Irish Lions tour to South Africa. After missing three tour matches due to enforced Covid-19 isolation, he was selected at full-back for the first Test match, playing the full 80 minutes as the Lions won 17-22. He also played for the full 80 minutes of the second Test the following week.

British & Irish Lions points

Personal life
Hogg's first child was born in late 2015. Hogg married in August 2016, and became a father for a second time in 2017.

Popular culture
Hogg is briefly mentioned on Pottermore, in an excerpt written by J.K. Rowling for the website, suggesting that he and fellow players Jim Hamilton and Kelly Brown are in fact squibs – wizard-born with no magical powers – masquerading as muggles. In a tweet, J.K. Rowling later insinuated that Hogg was, in fact, a full-fledged Wizard.

Honours

Glasgow Warriors
Guinness Pro12 Champions: 2014-15

Exeter Chiefs
Gallagher Premiership Champions: 2019-20

European Champions Cup Champions: 2019-20

Individual
RBS Six Nations Player of the Championship: 2016, 2017

References

External links

 profile at Scottish Rugby

1992 births
Living people
Ayr RFC players
British & Irish Lions rugby union players from Scotland
Glasgow Warriors players
Hawick RFC players
People educated at Hawick High School
Rugby union fullbacks
Rugby union players from Melrose, Scottish Borders
Scotland international rugby union players
Scottish rugby union players
Stirling County RFC players